Senyo Dam  is an earthfill dam located in Hiroshima Prefecture in Japan. The dam is used for irrigation. The catchment area of the dam is 2.2 km2. The dam impounds about 2  ha of land when full and can store 195 thousand cubic meters of water. The construction of the dam was started on 1972 and completed in 1976.

References

Dams in Hiroshima Prefecture